In computer science, an FM-index is a compressed full-text substring index based on the Burrows–Wheeler transform, with some similarities to the suffix array. It was created by Paolo Ferragina and Giovanni Manzini, who describe it as an opportunistic data structure as it allows compression of the input text while still permitting fast substring queries. The name stands for Full-text index in Minute space.

It can be used to efficiently find the number of occurrences of a pattern within the compressed text, as well as locate the position of each occurrence. The query time, as well as the required storage space, has a sublinear complexity with respect to the size of the input data.

The original authors have devised improvements to their original approach and dubbed it "FM-Index version 2". A further improvement, the alphabet-friendly FM-index, combines the use of compression boosting and wavelet trees to significantly reduce the space usage for large alphabets.

The FM-index has found use in, among other places, bioinformatics.

Background 

Using an index is a common strategy to efficiently search a large body of text. When the text is larger than what reasonably fits within a computer's main memory, there is a need to compress not only the text but also the index. When the FM-index was introduced, there were several suggested solutions that were based on traditional compression methods and tried to solve the compressed matching problem. In contrast, the FM-index is a compressed self-index, which means that it compresses the data and indexes it at the same time.

FM-index data structure 

An FM-index is created by first taking the Burrows–Wheeler transform (BWT) of the input text. For example, the BWT of the string "abracadabra$" is "ard$rcaaaabb", and here it is represented by the matrix  where each row is a rotation of the text, and the rows have been sorted lexicographically. The transform corresponds to the last column labeled .

The BWT in itself allows for some compression with, for instance, move to front and Huffman encoding, but the transform has even more uses. The rows in the matrix are essentially the sorted suffixes of the text and the first column F of the matrix shares similarities with suffix arrays. How the suffix array relates to the BWT lies at the heart of the FM-index.

Count 

The operation count takes a pattern  and returns the number of occurrences of that pattern in the original text . The operation iterates backwards over the pattern. For every character in the pattern, the range that has the character as a suffix is found. For example, the count of the pattern "bra" in "abracadabra" follows these steps:
This range over  represents every character of  that has a suffix beginning with a.
Now that the whole pattern has been processed, the count is the same as the size of the range: .

Because  can be performed in constant time, count can complete in linear time in the length of the pattern:  time.

Locate 

For instance . To locate every occurrence of a pattern, first the range of character is found whose suffix is the pattern in the same way  the count operation found the range. Then the position of every character in the range can be located.

If  has a position associated with it,  is trivial. If it's not associated, the string is followed with  until an associated index is found. By associating a suitable number of indices, an upper bound can be found. Locate can be implemented to find occ occurrences of a pattern  in a text  in  time with  bits per input symbol for any .

Applications

DNA read mapping 

FM index with backtracking has been successfully (>2000 citations) applied to approximate string matching/sequence alignment, See Bowtie http://bowtie-bio.sourceforge.net/index.shtml

See also 
 Burrows–Wheeler transform
 Suffix array
 Compressed suffix array
 Sequence alignment
 Wavelet Tree

References

Substring indices
String data structures